Cayla George (née Francis; born 1 May 1989) is an Australian professional basketball player for the Las Vegas Aces of the Women's National Basketball Association (WNBA). She was a member of the Australian Women's basketball team (Opals) at the 2020 Tokyo Olympics. The Opals were eliminated after losing to the USA in the quarterfinals.

Francis plays for the Melbourne Boomers of the Women's National Basketball League (WNBL). She has also played in several other leagues including the Central Australian Basketball League, SEABL, LFB and WNBL. She has represented South Australia in the National Junior Championships, winning a silver medal in the U18 Championships in 2005. In the WNBL, she has played for the Australian Institute of Sport, Adelaide Lightning, Logan Thunder and Townsville Fire. She plays center for the Opals, making her senior debut in 2008.

Early life
Francis was born on 1 May 1989 in Mount Barker, South Australia. Her mother, older sister and half sister live in South Australia, while her father lives in Cairns. She lived with her father in Fiji for four months during 2001.

Francis started out playing netball, but ultimately chose basketball because she preferred the contact aspect of the sport.

Playing career
Francis played in the Central Australian Basketball League for the Eastern Mavericks.  She was with the team for the 2007 season and went on to help her team win their first league championship in 2008.  She was named the league's best and fairest, winning the Halls Medal.  She was also named the league's player of the year in 2008.  She averaged 22.4 points per game in 2008.  She led the league that season in offensive rebounding with 4.8 per game.  She also led the league in defensive rebounds per game with 14.2.   She led in the rebounding category with 18.9 per game.

In 2009, Francis played for the Ballarat Lady Miners in the SEABL. In 2010, she played for the Sandringham Sabres in the SEABL. In 2011, she played in the Queensland Basketball League for the Cairns Dolphins. Her play with the team drew the attention the national selectors. In the 2011 season, she was the player of the round in two separate weeks. The first time was in round two. The second time was in round four. She was named a third time in round nine. In an April 2011 game in the SEABL, she scored 26 points and had 16 rebounds.

Francis earned a silver medal with South Australia Metro at the 2005 U18 National Junior Championships. She participated in the U16 National Junior Championships in 2005, playing for South Australia Country. In 2006, she participated in the U18 National Junior Championships for South Australia Country. In 2006, she was named the South Australian Under 21 Player of the Year. She has won the R.E. Staunton award winner for Female MVP at U20 National Championships in 2008.In 2019 she join the new Hobart women's team the Hobart Huskies for the first three game of the NBL1 season.

WNBL
 
Francis played for the Australian Institute of Sport team for three years, including for the 2005/2006 season. In 2007, she won the WNBL Bettie Watson Rookie of the Year. During the 2007/2008 season, her Australian Institute of Sport team won eight games.

Francis signed with the Adelaide Lightning in 2008. She played with the team during the 2008/2009 and 2009/2010 seasons. By November 2008 in the 2008/2009 season, she was averaging 16 points a game and 10.6 rebounds a game. In a November 2008 90–62 win over the Australian Institute of Sport, she scored 17 points, and had 7 rebounds in the game. In a November 2009 game against the Australian Institute of Sport which her won 100–77, while on the court 23:38 minutes, she scored 24 points and had a field goal percentage of 75%. In an October 2009 game Adelaide won 75–66 against Dandenong, she had 26 points and 17 rebounds, and had a field goal percentage of 50%.  She did not miss a single one of her free throw shots.

Francis joined the Logan Thunder in 2010. She played for them in 2010/2011 and 2011/2012. In November 2011, she helped her team stage a come from behind victory against the West Coast Waves. She wore no. 4 for the team. In January 2012, she was one of three players seriously considered for player of the week but lost to American Shanavia Dowdell.

Francis returned to the WNBL with the Townsville Fire in 2014.
George signed with the Melbourne boomers for the 2018/19 wnbl season

WNBA
On 4 February 2015, Francis signed with the WNBA's Phoenix Mercury. In February 2017, Francis was re-acquired by the Mercury.

On 2 February 2018, George was traded to the Connecticut Sun. On 16 May 2018, George was waived by the Connecticut Sun.  On 3 June 2018, George was signed by the Dallas Wings.

On 1 February 2023, George signed as a free agent with the Las Vegas Aces.

National team career
Francis plays center for the Opals. She was a member of the 2008 Opals squad. In late March, early April 2008, she participated in a week long training camp with the national team in Canberra. In 2008, she had her first Opals cap in a game against New Zealand women's national basketball team. She was a member of the 2009 Opals squad. She was a member of the 2011 Opals squad and, as a member of the team, she earned a gold medal at the FIBA Oceania Championship. In June 2011, she participated in a national team training camp in Canberra. In late July 2011, she played in a three-game test series against China played in Queensland. She was scheduled to participate in the national team training camp held from 14 to 18 May 2012 at the Australian Institute of Sport.

Francis has also played for Australia's age restricted national sides. She has 31 caps for Australia's junior national team and 14 appearances for the Young Australia team. In 2006, as a member of the Gems, she participated in the Taipei hosted William Jones Cup. In 2006, she was a member of Australia's Under-21 national team, the Sapphires. As a member of the Australian team at the 2007 FIBA U19 World Championship for Women, she finished fifth. She averaged 12.1 points and 7.1 rebounds per game in the competition. In the first-round game against Brazil, she scored 20 points, and went three for three in three-point range. She also had 10 rebounds in the game against Brazil. She averaged 21.1 points per game, 7.1 rebounds per game and 0.3 assists per game. She played 204 minutes in 9 games. She made 43 out of 99 attempted field goals. She was 14/16 at the free throw line. She had 20 offensive rebounds and 44 defensive rebounds. Francis earned a silver medal at the 2007 FIBA World Championship for Under 21 Women held in Moscow. At the 2007 FIBA U21 World Championship for Women, she averaged 8.6 points per game, 7.6 rebounds per game and 0.5 assists per game. In the competition, she wore number 11. In 2011, she represented Australia at the World University Games.

Francis, like all the other members of the 2020 Tokyo Olympics Opals women's basketball team, had a difficult tournament. The Opals lost their first two group stage matches. They looked flat against Belgium and then lost to China in heartbreaking circumstances. In their last group match the Opals needed to beat Puerto Rico by 25 or more in their final match to progress. This they did by 27 in a very exciting match. However, they lost to the United States in their quarterfinal 79 to 55.

See also 
List of Australian WNBA players

References

External links

1989 births
Living people
Adelaide Lightning players
Australian expatriate basketball people in France
Australian expatriate basketball people in Hungary
Australian expatriate basketball people in the United States
Australian Institute of Sport basketball (WNBL) players
Australian women's basketball players
Basketball players at the 2016 Summer Olympics
Basketball players at the 2018 Commonwealth Games
Basketball players at the 2020 Summer Olympics
Centers (basketball)
Commonwealth Games medallists in basketball
Commonwealth Games gold medallists for Australia
Connecticut Sun players
Forwards (basketball)
Logan Thunder players
Olympic basketball players of Australia
People from Mount Barker, South Australia
Phoenix Mercury players
Sportswomen from South Australia
Townsville Fire players
Universiade bronze medalists for Australia
Universiade medalists in basketball
Women's National Basketball League players
Medallists at the 2018 Commonwealth Games